This is a list of African Academy Award winners and nominees, which includes both ethnic African people born and/or raised in Africa and non-ethnic Africans born and raised in Africa.

Best Actor

Best Actress

Best Actor in a Supporting Role

Best Actress in a Supporting Role

Best Cinematography

Best Director

Best Documentary Feature

Best Film Editing

Best International Feature Film
The Academy Award for Best International Feature Film is awarded to a country, not to an individual, and the submitting country is the officially designated nominee in this category.

Best Live Action Short Film

Best Makeup and Hairstyling

Best Music, Original Score

Best Music, Original Song

Best Writing (Adapted Screenplay)

Best Writing (Original Screenplay)

See also 
 List of Asian Academy Award winners and nominees
 List of black Academy Award winners and nominees
 List of Puerto Rican Academy Award winners and nominees

African
African cinema